Seekkuge Prasanna (born 27 June 1985) is a professional Sri Lankan cricketer, who plays for limited over cricket. He is a warrant officer in the Sri Lankan Army. Prasanna is known for aggressive batting at the late overs in ODIs, and a useful leg-spinner, probably the best found after former Sri Lanka leg-spinner Upul Chandana.

Domestic and T20 career
In March 2019, he was named in Colombo's squad for the 2019 Super Provincial One Day Tournament. In October 2020, he was drafted by the Kandy Tuskers for the inaugural edition of the Lanka Premier League.

In April 2021, he was signed by Lahore Qalandars to play in the rescheduled matches in the 2021 Pakistan Super League. In August 2021, he was named in the SLC Reds team for the 2021 SLC Invitational T20 League tournament. In November 2021, he was selected to play for the Colombo Stars following the players' draft for the 2021 Lanka Premier League. In July 2022, he was signed by the Colombo Stars for the third edition of the Lanka Premier League.

International career
Prasanna made his Test cricket debut for Sri Lanka on 8 September 2011  at Pallekele International Cricket Stadium against Australia. The ODI debut came against Australia at the same series in 2011. His Twenty20 International debut came against Pakistan at UAE in 2013.

Prasanna was not in the original squad in 2015 ICC Cricket World Cup, but he was called into the World Cup squad as a replacement for injured Dimuth Karunaratne. He played his first World Cup game against Scotland on 11 March 2015.

Power hitting
After dropped from the squad due to poor performances, Prasanna rejoined to the limited over Sri Lanka squad for game against Ireland in 2016. On 18 June 2016, in the second match against Ireland, Prasanna scored a devastating inning which earned him his highest ODI score. He got out for 95 runs just off 45 balls, just fell short for the fastest century for Sri Lanka. Sri Lanka scored 377 runs in the match and finally won the match by 136 runs.

His devastating form in Ireland continued in England. During the first ODI against England , Prasanna scored 25 ball 59 runs, including four huge sixes. However the match ended with a tie. Prasanna scored 95 at strike rate 206.52 against Ireland in last ODI and 59 at 210.71 in this match. With that Prasanna became the third Sri Lanka player after Sanath Jayasuriya and Thisara Perera to make 2 fifty-plus scores at a strike rate of 200-plus in ODIs.

During the third T20I against South Africa in the decider, Prasanna helped Sri Lanka to win the match and seal the series 2–1 by hitting match-winning 16-ball 37 runs in the last overs with three sixes and three fours. This win gave Sri Lankans their first ever series win in any format against South Africa in South Africa as well. This is also Sri Lanka's highest chase in all T20Is.

Military career
He is currently serving in the Sri Lanka Army as a Warrant Officer I attached to the 2nd Regiment, Sri Lanka Army Ordnance Corps, promoted on 1 March 2017.

See also
 One-Test wonder

References

External links
 

1985 births
Badulla District cricketers
Fortune Barishal cricketers
Basnahira cricketers
Hambantota Troopers cricketers
Kandurata cricketers
Living people
Northamptonshire cricketers
Sri Lankan cricketers
Sri Lanka Test cricketers
Sri Lanka One Day International cricketers
Sri Lanka Twenty20 International cricketers
Sri Lanka Army Sports Club cricketers
Southern Express cricketers
Uva Next cricketers
Dhaka Dominators cricketers
Khulna Tigers cricketers
Rajshahi Royals cricketers
Trinbago Knight Riders cricketers
Lahore Qalandars cricketers
Kandy Falcons cricketers
Sri Lanka Army Ordnance Corps soldiers
Colombo Stars cricketers